Wolf Club (often stylized as W O L F C L U B) is an English electropop band from Nottingham.

History
Formed in 2014, the band consists of Steven Wilcoxson (producer, guitarist and songwriter) and Chris Paul-Martin (producer, vocalist, and songwriter). They are often joined on stage by DJ Tim Hartwell.

They released their debut album W O L F C L U B in June 2017.

In 2018, the band signed with Time Slave Recordings and released the album Chasing The Storm in June 2018. "Summer Lights" was the first single released and became number 2 in the Amazing Radio chart.

Later in 2018, the band signed with New Retro Wave Recordings, and in November 2018 released their third studio album Infinity, which was the highest selling album in the world on Bandcamp in its first week of release.

Wolf Club have been played on BBC Radio multiple times.

In 2019 the band was to play the main stage at the Y Not Festival. The band released their 4th studio album Frontiers on Friday August 2nd, which debuted at number 7 in the Billboard electronic chart. The album peaked at number 8 in the UK and number 9 in the US iTunes downloads chart respectively.

In 2020 the band released RUNAWAYS. The album reached number 2 on the electronic iTunes chart. 2 tracks from this album RUSH and REBELS were written for the number one US box office movie Infamous starring Bella Thorne and written and directed by Joshua Caldwell. The movie contained 6 tracks by Wolf Club.

Discography

References 

English electronic music groups